Artemisia biennis is a species of sagebrush known by the common name biennial wormwood. It is a common and widely distributed weed, so well established in many places that its region of origin is difficult to ascertain. One source (Flora of North America) maintains that the species is most likely native to northwestern North America and naturalized in Europe, New Zealand, and eastern and southern North America.

Description
It is generally hairless and unscented. The inflorescence is a dense rod of clusters of flower heads interspersed with leaves. The fruit is a tiny achene less than a millimeter wide.

Invasive species
It is an invasive species and noxious weed in many places. It is a weed of several agricultural crops, particularly soybeans, other types of dry edible beans, and sunflowers.

References

External links

Jepson Manual Treatment

biennis
Flora of North America
Plants described in 1794